Sydney Walton Square is a public park located just west of the Embarcadero in San Francisco, California, United States. The park is named after San Francisco banker Sydney Grant Walton.  

The 2-acre park was designed by Peter Walker. It was created as part of the city of San Francisco's partnership with Golden Gateway Center to bring more public art to the area. The park consists of public artwork by Jim Dine (Big Heart on the Rock), Marisol Escobar (Portrait of Georgia O'Keeffe), George Rickey (Two Open Rectangles), Joan Brown (Pine Tree Obelisk), Benny Bufano (The Penguins), and Francois Stahly (Fountain of Four Seasons). An old arch from the Colombo Market also resides in the park. It is the only remaining structure from San Francisco's historical produce district.

References

Parks in San Francisco
Squares in San Francisco
Sculpture gardens, trails and parks in California